Siham-Soumeya Ben Nacer (born 8 August 1983) is a former Algerian female tennis player.

Playing for Algeria in Fed Cup, Ben Nacer has a W/L record of 6–7.

ITF Junior Finals

Singles Finals (2–2)

Doubles (6–1)

External links 
 
 
 

1983 births
Living people
Algerian female tennis players
21st-century Algerian people